Wood elf is a generic term for an elf that live in wooded areas such as forests.

Wood Elf may refer to:

 Silvan Elves, a fictional race in J.R.R. Tolkien's Middle-earth of northern Mirkwood and Lothlórien.
 Wood Elves (Warhammer), a fictional race in the Warhammer universe
 EverQuest, a 1999 player character race in the video game series, similar to those of Tolkien's fiction
 Wood Elves are playable characters in the game Sacred
 Wood Elves are also found in The Elder Scrolls series, known as Bosmers